Ben Stafford (born December 18, 1978) is a former American professional ice hockey player. Over four seasons, Stafford played 259 regular season games and 35 playoff games in the American Hockey League before retiring from hockey to join the United States Marine Corps.

Prior to turning professional, Stafford attended Yale University, where he played four seasons of NCAA Division I college hockey with the Yale Bulldogs men's ice hockey team.

Awards and honors

References

External links

1978 births
Living people
American men's ice hockey centers
Philadelphia Phantoms players
Providence Bruins players
Saint John Flames players
Trenton Titans players
Yale Bulldogs men's ice hockey players
Ice hockey players from Minnesota
Sportspeople from Edina, Minnesota